Deewana Hoon Pagal Nahi is a 1998 Hindi film starring Ayesha Jhulka and Vikas Bhalla in the lead.

Soundtrack
"Sone Jaisa Roop Hai Inka Rang Hai Inka" - Udit Narayan, Poornima
"Bhabhi Dil Ki Bholi Tu Kitni Bhali Hai" - Babla Mehta, Alka Yagnik
"English Gana Russi Gane Upar Gana" - Kavita Krishnamurthy, Sonu Nigam
"Nazaro Me Rang Hai Tumhare Labo Ka" - Kumar Sanu, Alka Yagnik
"Jab Se Mile Do Dil Ban Ne Lagi Dastan" - Vijeta Pandit, Kumar Sanu
"Jhumka Bhi Jhume" - Ila Arun
"Maiya Ki Ankho Ka" - Pamela Chopra, Suresh Wadkar
"Tere Naam Se Hai Jana" - Bela Sulakhe, Nitin Mukesh

External links

Films scored by Aadesh Shrivastava
1998 films
1990s Hindi-language films